The following is a list of stations found within the Beijing Subway.

Stations opened after 2007 have no official station codes.

Line 1 and Batong Line 

Since August 29, 2021, through services have operated between Line 1 and Batong Line, so the lines are effectively operated as a single line.

Line 2

Line 4 and Daxing Line

Through services operate on Line 4 and Daxing Line.

Line 5

Line 6

Line 7

Line 8

Line 9

Line 10

Line 11

Line 13

Line 14

Line 15

Line 16

Changping Line

Fangshan Line

Line S1

Xijiao Line

Yanfang Line

Yizhuang Line

Yizhuang T1 Line

Capital Airport Express

Daxing Airport Express

Notes

References 

 
Subway
Beijing Subway stations
Beijing